Bergaptol is a natural furanocoumarin with the molecular formula C11H6O4. It is found in the essential oils of citrus including lemon and bergamot.

Notes 

Furanocoumarins
Phenols